The Noney district of Manipur state has 4 subdivisions. It was created in 2016: at the time of the 2011 Census of India, it was a part of the Tamenglong district.

Subdivisions 

The Noney district has four subdivisions:

 Haochong
 Khoupum
 Longmai
 Nungba

Villages

Haochong subdivision 

The Haochong subdivision has following villages:

Khoupum subdivision 

The Khoupum subdivision has following villages:

Longmai subdivision 

The Longmai subdivision has following villages:

Nungba subdivision 

The Nungba subdivision has following villages:

References 

Noney